Meta Vannas (born Meta Jürgenson, 1949–1975 Meta Jangolenko; 9 January 1924 – 25 November 2002) was an Estonian Soviet politician. She was a member of the Communist Party of Estonia.

Vannas was born in Suuremõisa, Hiiu County. Following the German occupation of Estonia during World War II, she was imprisoned in Haapsalu and Tallinn and in 1944-1945 at Stutthof concentration camp. From 1940-1975, she was married to Mihhail Jangolenko.

She was the Minister of Public Service 1969–1975, Deputy Chairman of the Presidium of the Supreme Soviet of the Estonian Soviet Socialist Republic 1975 – 25 May 1978, Acting Chairman of the Presidium of the Supreme Soviet of the Estonian Soviet Socialist Republic 25 May 1978 – 26 July 1978 and Deputy Chairman of the Presidium of the Supreme Soviet of the Estonian Soviet Socialist Republic 26 July 1978 – 1985. She died in Tallinn, aged 78.

Orders 
Order of Lenin

References

Sources 
Female Leaders of Understate Entities
World Statesmen.org

1924 births
2002 deaths
People from Hiiumaa Parish
Members of the Central Committee of the Communist Party of Estonia
Heads of state of the Estonian Soviet Socialist Republic
People's commissars and ministers of the Estonian Soviet Socialist Republic
Members of the Supreme Soviet of the Estonian Soviet Socialist Republic, 1963–1967
Members of the Supreme Soviet of the Estonian Soviet Socialist Republic, 1967–1971
Members of the Supreme Soviet of the Estonian Soviet Socialist Republic, 1971–1975
Members of the Supreme Soviet of the Estonian Soviet Socialist Republic, 1975–1980
Members of the Supreme Soviet of the Estonian Soviet Socialist Republic, 1980–1985
Mayors of Narva
Women mayors of places in Estonia
Soviet women in politics
Stutthof concentration camp survivors
Recipients of the Order of Lenin
Recipients of the Order of the Red Banner of Labour